Azanus soalalicus, the small Madagascar babul blue, is a butterfly in the family Lycaenidae. It is found on Madagascar. The habitat consists of forests.

References

Butterflies described in 1900
Azanus
Butterflies of Africa
Taxa named by Ferdinand Karsch